The West End Neighborhood Library is a branch of the District of Columbia Public Library in the West End neighborhood of Washington, D.C. It is located at 2301 L Street NW. The library opened in 1967 at 1101 24th Street NW and was the city's first public library branch to offer air conditioning.  A new library opened in 2017 as part of a mixed-use development project designed by architect Enrique Norton.

References

External links
Official website

Public libraries in Washington, D.C.